Ranunculus trichophyllus, the threadleaf crowfoot, or thread-leaved water-crowfoot, is a plant species in the genus Ranunculus, native to Europe, Asia and North America.

It is a herbaceous annual or perennial plant generally found in slow flowing streams, ponds, or lakes. The daisy-like flowers are white with a yellow centre, with five petals.
It is similar in form to Ranunculus fluitans (river water-crowfoot), apart from flower petal number, thread-leaved has on 5 petals and shorter leaves, as thread-leaved prefers slower flowing waters. It also has rounded seed heads which become fruits covered with bristles.
The segmented leaves and the plants ability to photosynthesis underwater have been studied.

Taxonomy
It was first described and published by the French naturalist and botanist Dominique Villars in his book 'Histoire des plantes du Dauphiné' Vol.3 on page 335 in 1786.

The species epithet trichophyllus is Latin for 'hairy leaves'.

In North America it is also commonly known as the 'white water crow foot'. The Icelandic name of this species is Lónasóley.

Subspecies:
 Ranunculus trichophyllus subsp. eradicatus (Laest.) C.D.K.Cook (synonym: Batrachium eradicatum (Laest.) Fr.)

Distribution and habitat
The plant is found in most of the Northern Hemisphere, from the United States, Europe and the Mediterranean, east through Siberia, the Caucasus, the Middle East, the Himalayas, Kazakhstan and Mongolia to Kamchatka in Russia, also in Japan, China and Korea.
It is even found in the lakes and ponds of Mount Everest.

Range
It grows in freshwater, found in dune slacks and drainage ditches to ponds, lakes, streams and slow-flowing rivers.

References

trichophyllus
Plants described in 1786
Flora of the United Kingdom
Flora of the United States
Flora of Europe
Flora of Siberia
Flora of the Caucasus
Flora of Nepal
Flora of Kazakhstan
Flora of Mongolia
Flora of Russia
Flora of Japan
Flora of China
Flora of Korea
Least concern plants